The  is an academic journal of Japanese history. Several issues are published each year in Japanese, with summaries in English, by the National Museum of Japanese History.

See also
 Cultural Properties of Japan

References

External links 
  (only abstracts)
 Digital text repository

Historiography of Japan
Japanese studies journals
Japanese-language journals
Publications established in 1982
Academic journals published by museums
1982 establishments in Japan